Sakal Deep Rajbhar (born 1 January 1956) is an Indian politician. He is an elected as the Member of Parliament Rajya Sabha From Ballia Constituency, representing Uttar Pradesh in the Rajya Sabha the upper house of India's Parliament representing the Bharatiya Janata Party.

Early life 
Sakal Deep Rajbhar is one of the oldest BJP leaders in the state and has been associated with the Sangh for a long time. Sakaldeep Rajbhar, resident of the Belthra road assembly constituency, had contested the assembly elections in 2002, but had to face defeat. Graduati, who received education from Inter, had also contested the election of Gram Pradhan in 1995 and was also involved in agricultural work. Salkadeep has also worked for Moharruer in Tehsil Rajbhar. After securing the Belthra Road Legislative Assembly, Sakladip Rajbhar had contested for a ticket from Sikandarpur in the Legislative Assembly elections in 2017, but he did not get the ticket.

References

1956 births
Living people
Rajya Sabha members from Uttar Pradesh
People from Ballia district
Bharatiya Janata Party politicians from Uttar Pradesh